José Jorge Alperovich (born 13 April 1955) is an Argentine politician and who has served as governor of Tucumán Province from 2003 to 2015. He was elected in 2003, and reelected in 2007 and 2011. He is married to Beatriz Rojkés de Alperovich, who served as National Senator and president of the Justicialist Party in his province. Alperovich himself was a National Senator for Tucumán from 2001 to 2008, and then from 2015 to 2021.

Biography

Early life and education
Alperovich was born in Banda del Río Salí to Marta León, an Argentine Jew, and León Alperovich, a Lithuanian Jew from Lithuania whose parents had settled in one of the numerous Jewish agricultural colonies in Argentina. His father relocated to Tucumán Province and later established León Alperovich S.A., one of the most important auto dealerships in Tucumán.

He enrolled at the University of Tucumán, graduated as an accountant, and married Beatriz Rojkés, with whom he had four children.

Career
He worked as an accountant for several years, then began his political career in the provincial legislature in 1995. He served as chairman of the provincial Committee of Finance and Budget under Governor Antonio Bussi.

Alperovich was a member of the centrist Radical Civic Union until 1999, when Bussi failed to achieve re-election and the new Justicialist Party governor, Julio Miranda , appointed Alperovich to be Minister of Economy. Alperovich thereupon switched to the Justicialist Party. His appointment to the ministerial position was part of an agreement that was designed to maintain a channel of communications between the Justicialist Party and the Alliance government of Fernando de la Rúa. Alperovich was elected to the Senate amid the political crisis of 2001, and ran for governor of Tucumán Province in 2003.

Some commentators had speculated that Alperovich would not be able to become governor if elected because of the provincial law that required him to give an oath on the Christian Bible. A constitutional crisis ensued; ultimately, Alperovich's challenge to the provincia law met with success in the Supreme Court, which amended Tucumán's Constitution to allow Alperovich to take the oath on the Hebrew Torah.

Alperovich owns several houses and apartments, concessionaires, and many acres of soybeans and cattle. He has auto dealerships, sells truck and agricultural machinery, and is also active in hotel and commercial development and in construction and real estate. He owns several apartment buildings in San Miguel de Tucumán and over 120,000 hectares of land in Tucumán, Salta, and Santiago del Estero provinces.

Governor of Tucumán Province
During his early years as governor, Alperovich formed strong political ties with President Nestor Kirchner, who provided funds for various projects in the province that included a comprehensive public-works program. Consequently Alperovich's tenure as governor has been marked by significant developments in health, education, and social services and record public works funding for extensive public housing, highways, and other projects.

He was re-elected governor in 2007 with more than 78% of the vote. In that year a law was passed limiting the number of gubernatorial terms to two, starting in 2007. In that year, he was reelected by a 73% margin over Ricardo Bussi, who ran on the right-wing Republican Force ticket, He secured a constitutional amendment that would allow him to run for a third term, and in 2008 unsuccessfully proposed another amendment that would remove all gubernatorial term limits.

Alperovich was able to run for a third term because his 2003-07 term did not count under the 2007 term-limits law, which limited governors of Tucumán to two terms, starting in 2007. He was the first governor in the modern history of Tucumán to be elected for a third time.

His wife was elected Provisional President of the Argentine Senate in November 2011, and served in the post until February 2014.

Alperovich announced on January 15, 2014, that he would not seek a fourth term as governor, but “did not dismiss the possibility that his wife, Senator Beatriz Rojkés, would run to succeed him in 2015.”

Sexual assault allegation
He was charged by the Public Prosecutor for the complaint of sexual abuse by his niece.

References

External links 
Gobierno de Tucumán
Ministerio de Economia de Tucuman
PJ Tucumán

1955 births
Living people
People from Tucumán Province
20th-century Argentine Jews
Argentine people of Russian-Jewish descent
Argentine people of Lithuanian-Jewish descent
Jewish Argentine politicians
National University of Tucumán alumni
Argentine accountants
Argentine businesspeople
Radical Civic Union politicians
Justicialist Party politicians
Members of the Argentine Senate for Tucumán
Governors of Tucumán Province